Amir Hossein Sadeghi (born September 6, 1981) is an Iranian former football player who played in the Iran's Premier Football League throughout his career. He played as a defender, usually as a centre-back.

Club career

Esteghlal
He is one of the youth products of Esteghlal, he was called up to the senior team in 2003. After five years with Esteghlal and 113 league appearances he left and signed a one-year contract with Mes in 2008.

Mes Kerman
After one season with Mes in which he made 30 appearances, Sadeghi signed a two-year contract with Esteghlal.

Tractor
Sadeghi again left Esteghlal in 2011 and signed with Tractor. He played an important role in helping Tractor finish as runners-up in the Iran Pro League. In his only season with Tractor, Sadeghi made 31 appearances scoring twice.

Return to Esteghlal
He moved back to Esteghlal from Tractor in July 2012, in his first season back with Esteghlal, Sadeghi won the Iran Pro League title for the second time in his career. On 13 July 2014, Sadeghi agreed on a new two-year contract with Esteghlal, keeping him until 2016.

Saba Qom
On 26 July 2015, he terminated his contract with Esteghlal and joined Saba Qom on a one-year contract.

Peykan 
In July 2016 after a season with Saba Qom and relegation to Azadegan League, Sadeghi decided to join Peykan for a two-year contract.

Club career statistics

1 Statistics Incomplete.

 Assist Goals

International career

He was named one of 23 members of Iranian national football team in 2006 World Cup in Germany.
He became a regular player for the 2007 AFC Asian Cup qualification but could not play any match in the actual competition as there were few arguments and differences with the coach Amir Ghalenoei in Malaysia. He was called to Team Melli again for the 2010 World Cup qualification but never played any match and while Carlos Queiroz was in charge he was invited again for the last 3 matches of 2014 World Cup qualifications where Iran qualified for the tournament while Sadeghi played all the three games.
He scored his first international goal on 19 November 2013 against Lebanon in the 2015 AFC Asian Cup qualification. On 1 June 2014, he was called into Iran's 2014 FIFA World Cup squad by Carlos Queiroz. He played the full 90 minutes in all three matches for Team Melli, and was one of Iran's key players in defense. He was called into Iran's 2015 AFC Asian Cup squad on 30 December 2014 by Carlos Queiroz.

International Goals

Scores and results list Iran's goal tally first.

Honours

Club
Esteghlal
Iran Pro League: 2003–04 (Runner-up), 2005–06, 2010–11 (Runner-up), 2012–13
Hazfi Cup: 2003–04 (Runner-up), 2007–08

Tractor
Iran Pro League: 2011–12 (Runner-up)

References

External links
 Amir Hossein Sadeghi at TeamMelli.com
 

1981 births
Living people
Iranian footballers
Iran international footballers
Association football defenders
Persian Gulf Pro League players
Esteghlal F.C. players
Saba players
Sanat Mes Kerman F.C. players
Tractor S.C. players
2006 FIFA World Cup players
2007 AFC Asian Cup players
People from Tehran
2014 FIFA World Cup players
2015 AFC Asian Cup players